Siak, is a regency (kabupaten) of Riau Province, on the island of Sumatra, Indonesia. It has an area of 8,556.09 km² and had a population of 376,742 at the 2010 Census and 457,940 at the 2020 Census, comprising 236,494 male and 221,446 female. The administrative centre of the regency is located at Siak Sri Indrapura. The northern part of this regency is covered by the Bukit Batu Biosphere Reserve.

Previously the area was part of the Sultanate of Siak Sri Indrapura. At the beginning of the independence of Indonesia, Sultan Syarif Kasim II, the Sultanate of Siak was the last state to join the Republic of Indonesia. Later this region was formed into an area under the Siak Kewedanan Bengkalis which later changed its status to the Regency of Siak. In 1999 under Law No. 53 of 1999, Siak Sri Indrapura was declared the capital of Siak Regency.

Administrative districts 

Siak Regency is divided into fourteen administrative districts (kecamatan), listed below with their areas and their populations at the 2010 Census and the 2020 Census. The table also includes the locations of the district administrative centres, and the number of villages (rural desa and urban kelurahan) in each district.

Transportation

Water
From Pekanbaru, Siak can be reached by river from Pekanbaru's Port, There is usually a boat that operates every 4-5 times a week with a travel time of around 2–4 hours. In addition to Pekanbaru, this port also serves other destinations including Bengkalis, Selat Panjang, and Batam (via Buton Bengkalis).

Land

Other than by river, Siak can also be reached by road, From Pekanbaru which is about a 3 to 4 hour journey. In addition Siak has a bridge that connects Siak with its capital which is named  Tengku Agung Sultana Latifah  which is the name of a previous Sultan of Siak. This bridge was inaugurated on 11 August 2007 and was known as the longest bridge in Indonesia until 2010, until the construction of the Suramadu Bridge in Surabaya was finished.

Tourism

Tours of Siak include the Siak Sri Indrapura Palace, which is a historic palace of the Sultanate of Siak. The palace is very famous, many tourists visit to see the grandeur of the palace and the objects located within, such as the golden throne which belonged to the Sultan, the royal dining chairs and a Komet Music Box of which only one other remains in the world. This palace is open from 10 am to 4 pm.

Borders

Notes

References

External links

  
 

Regencies of Riau